His Majesty's Chief Inspector of Prisons is the head of HM Inspectorate of Prisons and the senior inspector of prisons, young offender institutions and immigration service detention and removal centres in England and Wales. The current chief inspector is Charlie Taylor.

HM Chief Inspector of Prisons is appointed by the Justice Secretary from outside the prison service for a period of five years. The post was created by royal sign-manual on 1 January 1981 and established by the Criminal Justice Act 1982 on the recommendation of a committee of inquiry into the UK prison service under Mr Justice May.

The chief inspector provides independent scrutiny of detention in England and Wales through carrying out announced and unannounced inspections of detention facilities. Their remit includes prisons, young offenders institutions, police cells and immigration service detention centres. They are also called upon to inspect prison facilities in Commonwealth dependencies and to assist with the monitoring of Northern Ireland prison facilities.

The chief inspector is not operationally part of His Majesty's Prison Service or the Ministry of Justice (United Kingdom), and both have been criticised at times in the reports issued by the chief inspector after prison visits, or in their annual report, delivered to the Justice Secretary and presented to Parliament. The inspectorate's independence has been interpreted differently by the different holders of the post. From the inspectorate of Stephen Tumim onwards, HM Chief Inspector of Prisons has been more willing to speak critically in public of government penal policy.

There is also a separate post of His Majesty's Inspectorate of Prisons for Scotland, and a HM Inspectorate of Probation.

HM Chief Inspectors of Prisons

 1981–1982: Philip Barry
 1982–1987: Sir James Hennessy, 
 1987–1995: Judge Tumim
 1995–2001: General Sir David Ramsbotham, 
 2001–2010: Dame Anne Owers, 
 2010–2016: Nick Hardwick
 2016–2020: Assistant Commissioner Peter Clarke, 
 2020–present: Charlie Taylor

External links
 HM Inspectorate of Prisons independent website

 
Penal system in England
Penal system in Wales